Major Rajasthani was an Indian singer-songwriter associated with Punjabi music. He was specially known for his sad songs.

Career
Some of his popular albums:
Aatam Hattya (the suicide)
Car Ribnan Wali
Chandri Bulauno Hatgi
Dhanwad Vichole Da
Jimmewar Tu Vairne
Pehli Mulaqat
Tere Gham Vich Ni Kurhiye
Yaad Chandri
Garib da dil
Jind Likhti Tere Na
Sadi Yaad Vairne
Chunni Shagana Di
Tere gam vich ni kudiye
Malwe Da Munda

Religious
Aaja Baba Nanaka
Machhiware Dian Janglan Ch

References

Punjabi-language singers
Punjabi-language lyricists
20th-century Indian male singers
20th-century Indian singers